The 2016 Shannons Nationals Motor Racing Round 1 was held at Sandown Raceway on April 1–3, 2016. It included Australian GT, Australian Formula 3, Australian Formula Ford, Kerrick Sports Sedans, Kumho V8 Touring Cars, Porsche GT3 Cup, Sports Racers and Touring Car Masters.

Results

Australian GT Championship

Qualifying

Race 1

Fastest Lap: 1:10.136 - Greg Taylor (Audi R8 LMS 2011)

Race 2

Fastest Lap: 1:10.465 - Greg Taylor (Audi R8 LMS 2011)

Australian Formula 3 Championship

Qualifying

Race 1

Fastest Lap: 1:07.658 - Tim Macrow (Dallara F307 HWA-Mercedes-Benz)

Race 2

Fastest Lap: 1:07.810 - Roland Legge (Dallara F308 HWA-Mercedes-Benz)

Race 3

Fastest Lap: 1:07.631 - Christopher Anthony (Dallara F308 HWA-Mercedes-Benz)

Australian Formula Ford Championship

Kerrick Sports Sedans

Kumho V8 Touring Car

Porsche GT3 Cup Challenge

Sport Racers Series

Touring Car Masters

References

Shannons Nationals
Motorsport at Sandown